Sonny Rollins with the Modern Jazz Quartet (also released as Sonny & the Stars) is a 1956 compilation album by jazz saxophonist Sonny Rollins, featuring his earliest recordings for the Prestige label under his leadership, including four tracks performed by Rollins with the Modern Jazz Quartet (John Lewis, Milt Jackson, Percy Heath, and Kenny Clarke), eight tracks where Kenny Drew and Art Blakey replace Lewis, Jackson, and Clarke, and one track with Miles Davis on piano.

The first four tracks, featuring the members of the Modern Jazz Quartet, had been previously released as the 7" 45rpm EP Sonny Rollins With  Modern Jazz Quartet (PREP 1337). Tracks 5–11 and 13 were featured on the Prestige 10 inch LP Sonny Rollins Quartet (1952)(PRLP 137), which is reissued in its entirety here. Track 12 was released on the 10" compilation Mambo Jazz (PRLP 135).

"I Know", featuring Miles Davis on piano, was recorded at the same session as four other tracks under Davis's name, using the same musicians, including the young Rollins. This was Davis's first recording session for Prestige Records and his first with Rollins. Producer Bob Weinstock tried to dissuade Davis from using Rollins, feeling he was not ready, but Davis persuaded Weinstock to let Rollins record a cut under his own name. The Davis tracks recorded that date were issued on the 10" LP Modern Jazz Trumpets and appeared on the album Miles Davis and Horns.

Reception

The AllMusic review by Lindsay Planer describes the album as a "fresh and vibrant baker's dozen of selections... a vital component in any jazz enthusiast's collection." Author and musician Peter Niklas Wilson called it "patchwork, but an interesting one."

Track listing
All compositions by Sonny Rollins except where indicated

 "The Stopper" – 2:59
 "Almost Like Being in Love" (Alan Jay Lerner, Frederick Loewe) – 3:26
 "No Moe" – 3:32
 "In a Sentimental Mood" (Duke Ellington, Manny Kurtz, Irving Mills) – 3:20
 "Scoops" – 2:16
 "With a Song in My Heart" (Lorenz Hart, Richard Rodgers) – 3:08
 "Newk's Fadeaway" – 3:15
 "Time on My Hands" (Harold Adamson, Mack Gordon, Vincent Youmans) – 2:42
 "This Love of Mine" (Sol Parker, Henry W. Sanicola, Jr., Frank Sinatra) – 2:26
 "Shadrack" (Robert MacGimsey) – 2:35
 "On a Slow Boat to China" (Frank Loesser) – 2:41
 "Mambo Bounce" – 2:25
 "I Know" (Miles Davis) – 2:32

Personnel
Tracks 1-4
Sonny Rollins – tenor saxophone
John Lewis – piano
Milt Jackson – vibes
Percy Heath – bass
Kenny Clarke – drums

Tracks 5-12
Sonny Rollins – tenor saxophone
Kenny Drew – piano
Percy Heath – bass
Art Blakey – drums

Track 13
Sonny Rollins – tenor saxophone
Miles Davis –  piano
Percy Heath – bass
Roy Haynes – drums

References

1956 albums
Prestige Records albums
Sonny Rollins albums
Modern Jazz Quartet albums
Albums produced by Bob Weinstock